Osteria Ai Pioppi is a restaurant located in Nervesa della Battaglia, Italy.  The restaurant's main attraction is a human-powered playground.

History

In 1969, the restaurant began as a small outdoor sausage and wine stand built by Bruno Ferrin. When Bruno needed hooks to hang sausages, he turned to a blacksmith, but was told he could make the hooks himself. This led to Bruno taking an interest in welding, and he began to weld pieces of metal together for the children who visited his restaurant. This welding project grew until Bruno had welded an entire amusement park of rides that were all human powered.

Attractions
A list of attractions that can be found at the playground outside the restaurant includes:
 Death Ride 
 Slide with Jumping
 3-lane slide
 Vitruvian Man
 Roller Curve
 Ballerina
 Hill
 Bob

References

Buildings and structures in the Province of Treviso
Restaurants in Italy
Playgrounds